Soma is a town and district of Manisa Province in the Aegean region of Turkey. According to the 2009 census, the population of the district is 101,011, of which 74,158 live in the town of Soma.

History
From 1867 until 1922, Soma was part of the Aidin Vilayet of the Ottoman Empire.

Economy 
Lignite mining and a lignite-fired thermal power plant are the main economic activities in Soma. During World War I the mines were opened up for production. The lignite extracted during that time was described as being of "very bad" quality. That lignite was burned with German coal for trains in the region. A small portion was exported to İzmir. A just transition from coal could be supported by the European Bank for Reconstruction and Development.

The Soma Wind Farm, with 119 wind turbines and an installed total capacity of 140.4 MW, is one of Turkey's largest wind farms.

Olive, walnut and almond cultivation is among the important agricultural activities of Soma.

2014 Soma coal mine disaster

On 13 May 2014, as a result of an explosion caused by a mine fire at the Soma coal mine, 301 workers were killed.

Notes

External links 
  
 Road map of Soma and environs

Populated places in Manisa Province